The following is an independently list of best-selling albums in Chile. Some of these figures are reported by national newspapers such as El Mercurio and La Tercera, forwarded by entities that includes Feria del Disco and Musimundo (then Chile's largest retailers) or music associations like Asociación de Productores Fonográficos de Chile (APF or IFPI Chile), Chile's record-industry trade group that compiled sales from five multionational labels that make up APF (Sony, BMG, EMI, Warner and Polygram Chile).

Chilean market have seen a decrease in their tallies figures since the late-1990s. Despite this, time to time the country have been included as one of the biggest 50th music markets during multiple reports by the International Federation of the Phonographic Industry (IFPI). Billboard found that the consumption of music by Chileans have been focused in international artists (Latino and non-Latinos artists), and that their local music represented only 20% share in 1996. Qué Pasa explained that international artists have been the priority by record labels, and at the sum of the year, yearly national best-selling albums have had an average of only 12% from their domestic acts according to La Segunda in a report from 2010.

Los Ramblers is believed to have the best-selling album in Chile, with estimated sales of 600,000 units, while Luis Miguel's Romances tracked sales of over 433,000 copies making it the best-selling album by an international act. In addition, Luis Miguel is the artist with the most entries, with at least 9 albums, followed by Los Prisioneros (3) and Maná (3), as well, five of those Miguel's albums attained sales of over 200,000 copies sold —the most by any other act with those figures.

Definitions 

Numerous records reached sales of 5,000 copies and above, but this list only include albums with sales of over 70,000 units. Titles reaching the 50,000 mark was a number considered to be a "successful record" in the country according to the author of the book La producción de música popular (1987).

If sales figures were not provided by the source and only show a certification-level obtained in Chile, those are not taken in consideration. This include examples such as Tango by Julio Iglesias (5× Platinum reported by Billboard in 2000) or Chayanne's albums Provócame and Tiempo de Vals (all of them, reported with multiplatinum-levels by El Tiempo in 1994).

All-time best-selling albums

Over 100,000 units

Over 70,000 units

Best-selling albums by year

Best-selling international artists in Chile 
In 1999, Luis Miguel was awarded with 3 special Diamond Award ("Disco de Diamante" from Spanish) recognizing "exceptional sales" of 1,750,000 units across the nation during his career. This award was later presented to Ricardo Arjona in 2006, when his total record sales reached the one million mark in the country. In comparison, Américo became the first Chilean artist to receive this recognition (2010) but lacked of support from IFPI Chile. While his record label, Feria Music (a label that shared 30% of the national sales value) awarded him as their best-selling artist, Karina Ruiz from IFPI Chile said that award from Feria Music isn't an official award from the industry. The next artist with sales reported close to the one million mark, is Juan Gabriel which reached the sum of 700,000 in 1999, and 950,000 units as of 2010. Luis Miguel remains the best-selling artist in Chile, with sales of over 2,500,000 units as of 2012, a sum that could be easily 3 million units according to La Tercera because his first records don't have scanned sales report.

See also 
 Music of Chile
 List of best-selling albums
 List of best-selling albums by country

References

External links 
 Streaming awards in Chile by PROFOVI
 "Ventas de discos en Chile alcanzan las cifras más bajas en diez años" by La Tercera

Chile